Frank James McGarr (February 25, 1921 – January 6, 2012) was a United States district judge of the United States District Court for the Northern District of Illinois.

Education and career

Born in Chicago, Illinois, McGarr attended St. Ignatius College Prep high school in Chicago and received an Artium Baccalaureus degree from Loyola University Chicago in 1942. McGarr served in the United States Army for the remainder of World War II, from 1942 to 1945. He received a Juris Doctor from Loyola University Chicago School of Law in 1950. McGarr was an assistant to the President of Loyola University Chicago from 1946 to 1952. He was in private practice in Chicago from 1952 to 1954. He was the First Assistant United States Attorney of the Northern District of Illinois from 1954 to 1958. He was in private practice in Chicago from 1958 to 1969. He was the first assistant state attorney general of Illinois from 1969 to 1970.

Federal judicial service

McGarr was nominated by President Richard Nixon on September 22, 1970, to the United States District Court for the Northern District of Illinois, to a new seat created by 84 Stat. 294. He was confirmed by the United States Senate on October 8, 1970, and received his commission on October 14, 1970. He served as Chief Judge from 1981 to 1986. He assumed senior status on June 30, 1986. McGarr served in that capacity until January 15, 1988, due to retirement.

Post-judicial career

After leaving the federal bench in 1988, McGarr went into private practice with the Chicago law firm of Phelan, Pope & John.

Illness and death

In recent years, McGarr had suffered from Parkinson's disease. He died on January 6, 2012, at his home in Downers Grove, Illinois, of complications from the disease.

References

Sources
 

1921 births
2012 deaths
Judges of the United States District Court for the Northern District of Illinois
United States district court judges appointed by Richard Nixon
20th-century American judges
United States Army personnel of World War II
Loyola University Chicago School of Law alumni
Judges of the United States Foreign Intelligence Surveillance Court
Assistant United States Attorneys